Irajabad may refer to:
 Irajabad, Ilam
 Irajabad, Razavi Khorasan